Abu Hamour is a district in the municipality of Al Rayyan in Qatar. Known to some as the "Wholesale Market District", it is a part of Metropolitan Doha.

Etymology
In Arabic, "abu" translates to "father" and in this context is used as a prefix for a specific characteristic of the area. The second part of the name, "hamour", is a specific type of fish that occurs commonly in Qatari waters. According to local tradition, the district was named after the type of fish most commonly caught by resident fishermen.

Administration

When free elections of the Central Municipal Council first took place in Qatar during 1999, Abu Hamour was designated the constituency seat of constituency no. 12. It would remain constituency seat in the next three consecutive elections until the fifth municipal elections in 2015, when it was split between constituencies no. 10 and no. 11. In the inaugural municipal elections in 1999, Hamad Mubarak Al Marri won the elections, receiving 36.4%, or 207, of the votes. Runner-up that year was Hafeez Salem Al Nabat Al Marri, whose share of the votes was 111, or 19.5%. Voter turnout was 75.7%. Khalid Mohammed Al-Ma'adid was elected in the 2002 elections. For the third municipal elections in 2007, Hamad Rashid Al Nabat was elected constituency representative. In 2011, Saleh Jaber Al Marri won the elections.

Areas

Baluchi Camp

A large area in Abu Hamour has been set aside by the government to house members of the Baluchi ethnic group. Originally, the Baluchis hail from Oman, Iran, and Pakistan, but began migrating to Qatar beginning in the 1950s, when Qatar started to reap the benefits of its oil drilling. First, the government designated a Baluchi housing area in Fereej Abdel Aziz in the 1950s, and later relocated them to Nuaija, before finally settling on Abu Hamour. There are currently thousands of Baluchis living in the camp, some of whom have positions in Qatar's government and army but do not possess Qatari citizenship.

The Qatari government provides the residents with building materials, although many of the structures do not meet regulations and contain illegal modifications. Infrastructure in the area is poor, with many of the 900 to 1000 houses lacking sewage and running water. There are two supermarkets and five mosques found in the camp.

Wholesale Market Area

The Wholesale Market Area in Abu Hamour previously accommodated Abu Hamour Central Market, one the largest marketplaces in Qatar. In the early 20th century, the wholesale market was located in the Al Jasrah area of Doha in what is presently Souq Waqif. As urban expansion continued unabated in Doha throughout the later 20th century, it was decided that the wholesale market would be transferred to Abu Hamour and remain under the jurisdiction of Doha, thus becoming the new western boundary of Greater Doha. While it still operated, the Abu Hamour Central Market contained a fresh vegetable and fruit market, a livestock market and an ornamental plants market. In early 2017 all wholesale shops in Abu Hamour Wholesale Market were shut down, most being shifted to the Umm Salal Central Market in Umm Salal Ali. The fruit and vegetable market was moved to Al Sailiya, while the livestock market, which frustrated locals had attributed a foul odor to, was transferred to Abu Samra in southern Qatar. Municipal officials plan to convert the now defunct Abu Hamour Central Market into a commercial complex.

Industry

As a result of its central location, Abu Hamour is an increasingly popular choice for retailers. A number of retail outlets from elsewhere in the country have relocated to the neighborhood. Historically, Abu Hamour hosted the largest wholesale market in the country, but in April 2017 the wholesale market was transferred to Umm Salal Ali.

Abu Hamour is the site of a refined petroleum products distribution depot which formerly belonged to the National Oil Distribution Company (NODCO), a subsidiary of QatarEnergy, until 2002 when newly-established Qatar Fuel assumed responsibility for the depot's management.

Transport
Currently, the underground Abu Hamour Metro Station is under construction, having been launched during Phase 1A. Once completed, it will be part of Doha Metro's Green Line.

Education
The following schools are located in Abu Hamour:

References

Populated places in Al Rayyan